Marco Sportiello (born 10 May 1992) is an Italian professional footballer who plays as a goalkeeper for  club Atalanta.

Club career
Born in Desio, Sportiello finished his graduation with Atalanta's youth system, and subsequently moved to Seregno in a co-ownership deal. A season later, Atalanta bought the remaining half of his rights back for free.

On 20 June 2011, Sportiello joined Poggibonsi, again in a co-ownership. A year later his rights were fully assigned to La Dea. On 14 July 2012, he moved to Carpi on a season-long loan deal. After being a regular starter during the promotion campaign to Serie B, Sportiello returned to Atalanta, being third-choice (behind Andrea Consigli and Giorgio Frezzolini).

On 4 December 2013, Sportiello made his Atalanta debut, starting in a 2–0 home win over Sassuolo, for the season's Coppa Italia; his Serie A debut came on 12 January of the following year, starting in a 2–1 home success over Catania.

After Consigli's departure to Sassuolo, Sportiello was made starter for the 2014–15 campaign, overtaking veterans Frezzolini and new signing Vlada Avramov.

On 13 January 2017, Fiorentina confirmed the signing of Sportiello from league rivals Atalanta on an 18-month loan (with an option to purchase). On 3 March 2018, the day before Fiorentina captain Davide Astori died in his sleep, Sportiello was the last person to see him alive.

On 6 July 2018, Sportiello signed with Frosinone on loan from Atalanta until 30 June 2019.

At the end of the loan spell he returned to Atalanta. On 11 March 2020, he made his debut with the club in the Champions League, in the round of 16 against Valencia.

International career
He has been called up for the 2015 UEFA European Under-21 Championship as a reserve goalkeeper, without having made his official debut with the Italy U21 side. He has been called up for the Italy training camp on 16 May 2016.

Career statistics

Club

References

External links

Profile at the Atalanta B.C. website

1992 births
Living people
People from Desio
Italian footballers
Association football goalkeepers
Serie A players
Serie C players
U.S. 1913 Seregno Calcio players
U.S. Poggibonsi players
A.C. Carpi players
Atalanta B.C. players
ACF Fiorentina players
Frosinone Calcio players
Footballers from Lombardy
Sportspeople from the Province of Monza e Brianza